Pesqueira (formerly known as Cimbres) is a Brazilian municipality in the state of Pernambuco. It had an estimated population in 2020 according to the IBGE, of 67,735. Its area is 980.876 km².

History
The municipality was created in 1762 under the name Cimbres. In 1836, the seat of the local authority was transferred from the town of Cimbres to that of Poço de Pesqueira. In 1880 the village was renamed with the saint's name Águeda de Pesqueira. In 1913 the whole municipality started to be called Pesqueira, instead of Cimbres.  In 1918, the city was made the seat of the Roman Catholic Diocese of Pesqueira.

Marian apparition 
The district of Cimbres, old seat of the municipality, was the site of the Cimbres Marian apparition, in 1936 and 1937.

Languages
The unattested indigenous languages Tchili and Walêcoxô were formerly spoken in Cimbres. The extinct Paratió language, originally spoken on the Capibaribe River, was reported by Loukotka (1968) to have been spoken by a few individuals in Cimbres. Various Xukuruan languages were also spoken in the Serra do Urubá (also known as the Serra do Arorobá or Serra do Ororubá) of Pesqueira municipality.

Geography

 State - Pernambuco
 Region - Agreste Pernambucano
 Boundaries - Paraiba and Poção   (N);  Venturosa and Alagoinha (S);  Arcoverde and Pedra  (W);  Belo Jardim, São Bento do Una, Capoeiras and Sanharó  (E)
 Area - 1000.2 km2
 Elevation - 654 m
 Hydrography - Ipanema, Ipojuca and Una rivers
 Vegetation - Caatinga Hipoxerófila.
 Climate - Semi desertic, hot and dry
 Annual average temperature - 22.4 c
 Main road -  BR 232
 Distance to Recife - 214 km

Economy

The main economic activities in Pesqueira are based in general commerce, services and primary sector.

Economic Indicators

Economy by Sector
2006

Health Indicators

References

Municipalities in Pernambuco